M.M.U. College of Pharmacy, an institution run by Madras-E-Madinathul-Uloom Trust (M.M.U. Trust), is a college in Ramanagaram, Karantaka.

Background 
M.M.U. College of Pharmacy was established in the year 1982 by Shri Haji Syed Muneer, offering a Diploma in Pharmacy and Bachelor of Pharmacy degree. Post graduate courses in pharmacy (M. Pharm) was started in 2009.

Facilities 

 Library 
 Cafeteria
 Laboratories 
 Auditorium 
 Guest room

References

Pharmacy schools in India
Colleges in Bangalore
Colleges affiliated to Rajiv Gandhi University of Health Sciences
Medical colleges in Karnataka
Educational institutions established in 1982
1982 establishments in Karnataka